Georges Govy (born 1913 Yevpatoria, Crimea, died 18 January 1975 Paris) was a French writer, journalist, and winner of the 1955 Prix Renaudot.

Life
His father was a famous painter, died during the Russian Revolution.  
He was a seaman, and settled in Paris. He was a foreign correspondent during the Spanish Civil War, and became friends with André Malraux.
He was a volunteer during World War II. In 1942, he joined the Mouvement de la jeunesse sioniste MJS (Zionist youth movement), in Grenoble, led by Toto Giniewski.

Works
Sang russe Ed. du Seuil, 1946, OCLC 490044370 
Le Moissonneur d'épines, La Table ronde. 1955 OCLC 59766686, Prix Renaudot. 
Sang d'Espagne, A. Fayard, 1958, OCLC 419948108 
Madonna ohne Wunder : Erzählungen Berlin : Verl. Volk u. Welt, 1963, OCLC 250864723 
Les jours maigres Ed. du Seuil, OCLC 369693724

References

External links
http://www.granger.com/results.asp?inline=true&image=0143057&wwwflag=1&imagepos=7&screenwidth=1003

Prix Renaudot winners
People from Yevpatoria
Emigrants from the Russian Empire to France
French male non-fiction writers
1913 births
1975 deaths
20th-century French journalists
20th-century French male writers